New Ross 20 is a Mi'kmaq reserve located in Lunenburg County, Nova Scotia.

It is administratively part of the Shubenacadie First Nation.

Indian reserves in Nova Scotia
Communities in Lunenburg County, Nova Scotia
Sipekneꞌkatik First Nation
Mi'kmaq in Canada